Niu Zhihong (born July 25, 1963), better known by her stage name Li Na, is a Chinese folk singer that gained particular popularity in the late 1980s and the 1990s China for singing many theme songs of highly-popular TV series, such as Kewang (1990). Earlier in her career she was a singer in Yu operas.

Her signature song is "Qingzang Gaoyuan" (青藏高原, "Tibetan Plateau"), theme song of the 1994 TV series Heaven Road.

In 1997 she became a Buddhist nun at Mount Wutai with the Dharma name Shi Changsheng (释昌圣; "Master Changsheng"). Since then she has released several albums on Buddhist music. She currently resides in the United States.

References
 "Pop sensation Li Na became a Buddhist nun in 1997, purportedly as a result of a traumatic romantic breakup, and immediately thereafter released a hugely popular CD of Buddhist chant. This CD features..."

Chinese folk singers
Buddhist music
1963 births
Chinese Buddhist nuns
Living people
20th-century Buddhist nuns
21st-century Buddhist nuns
20th-century Chinese actresses
20th-century Chinese women singers
Singers from Henan
Henan opera actresses
Actresses from Zhengzhou